Ulrich K. Preuß (born on 6 December 1939 in Marienburg, West Prussia) teaches Theories of the State at the Hertie School of Governance.

He holds a PhD from Gießen University and worked as Professor for Public Law at the University of Bremen from 1972 to 1996. Since 1996, Preuß has been a Professor of Public Law and Politics at Freie Universität Berlin. In 1989/90, he co-authored the draft of the constitution as a participant of the Round Table of the German Democratic Republic, and in 1992/93 he advised the Thuringian parliament on the conception of a new constitution. He has taught (among others) at Princeton University, New School University, and the University of Chicago. He is on the advisory board of various research institutions and is a member of the Staatsgerichtshof (State Supreme Court) in Bremen.

Selected bibliography
“The Critique of German Liberalism: A Reply to Kennedy”. Telos 71 (Spring 1987). New York: Telos Press.

External links

 Google result bibliography
 Biography at the Page of the Budapest Collegium
 Biography at the Hertie School of Governance

References

1939 births
Living people
People from Malbork
People from West Prussia
Jurists from Bremen (state)
Academic staff of the University of Bremen
Academic staff of Hertie School
Sozialistischer Deutscher Studentenbund members